Mount Lisicky is a peak,  high, standing  northwest of Mount Cocks in the Royal Society Range, Antarctica. It was mapped by the United States Geological Survey from ground surveys and Navy air photos, and was named by the Advisory Committee on Antarctic Names in 1963 for Captain Joseph F. Lisicky, United States Marine Corps, a maintenance officer for U.S. Navy Operation Deep Freeze, 1960, who served several summers at McMurdo Station.

References

Mountains of Victoria Land
Scott Coast